Hili land port is situated at Hakimpur Upazila in Dinajpur district, on the Bangladesh-India border.

Land Port
Hili Land Port covers an area of 10,000 acres and has a storage capacity of 10,000 MT. In 1985–86, the Hili customs station was established for export-import business between Bangladesh and India. Later in 1996, it was declared by the government a full-fledged customs station. In 2005, the government handed over the port for private management. On November, 2007 Panama Hili Port Link Limited took lease the port for 25 years. On the Indian side, the land port and border check post is at Hili, Dakshin Dinajpur.

Intergovernmental Agreement on Dry Ports is a 2013 United Nations treaty designed to promote the cooperation of the development of dry ports in the Asia-Pacific region.

Revenue earned
The port earned revenue of Tk85 crore in the first six months of current fiscal year 2012–13, exceeding the annual target Tk55 crore by 150 per cent.

References

Dinajpur District, Bangladesh